This is a list of town tramway systems in Sweden. It includes all tram systems in Sweden, past and present; cities with currently operating systems, and those systems themselves, are indicated in bold and blue background colored rows. The use of the diamond (♦) symbol indicates where there were (or are) two or more independent tram systems operating concurrently within a single metropolitan area.  Those tram systems that operated on other than standard gauge track (where known) are indicated in the 'Notes' column.

As at 2016, there were plans for new systems in several Swedish cities: Helsingborg, Jönköping, Linköping, Lund, Malmö, and Uppsala. The Lund tramway opened on 13 December 2020. None of the other systems have scheduled construction start dates.

See also
 List of town tramway systems – parent article
 List of town tramway systems in Europe
 List of tram and light rail transit systems
 List of metro systems

References

Tramways
Sweden

sv: Spårväg i Sverige